is a racing driver from Japan who currently competes in F4 Japanese Championship & Super Formula Lights. He is the current 2021 F4 Japanese Championship title winner.

Career
Nonaka started racing in 2019 competed in F4 Japanese Championship with TOM'S Spirit and managed to claimed 8th in his rookie season. He stays in the same series, but joined TGR-DC Racing School. In that season, he claimed 3rd place in the final standings. Nonaka once again continues to compete in the same series for the third season for 2021 with the same team from 2020. That season he clinches the title from Rin Arakawa & Iori Kimura in the last round at Fuji Speedway. In the same year of 2021, he competed in Super Formula Lights where he replaces Kazuto Kotaka who originally should compete in the series, but have to race in Super Formula with KCMG covered Kamui Kobayashi who can't compete in Japan due to travel restrictions. Nonaka competed all but 1 from 6 rounds.

Racing Record

Career summary

Complete F4 Japanese Championship results
(key) (Races in bold indicate pole position; races in italics indicate points for the fastest lap of top ten finishers)

Complete Super Formula Lights results 
(key) (Races in bold indicate pole position) (Races in italics indicate fastest lap)

References

External links
 

2000 births
Living people
Japanese racing drivers
Japanese Formula 3 Championship drivers
Super GT drivers
TOM'S drivers
Toyota Gazoo Racing drivers
Japanese F4 Championship drivers